Notable people named José María Sánchez include:

José María Sánchez Borbón (1918–1973), Panamanian writer
José María Sánchez Carrión (born 1952), Spanish linguist
José María Sánchez Lage (1931–2004), Argentine footballer
José María Sánchez Leiva (born 1985), Chilean footballer
José María Sánchez Martínez (born 1983), Spanish referee
José Maria Sanchez-Silva (1911–2002), Spanish children's writer
José María Sánchez-Verdú (born 1968), Spanish composer